The Sakeji River is a tributary of the Zambezi. The river rises to the south of Kalene Hill in Mwinilunga District, Zambia. It flows northward to join the upper reaches of the Zambezi from the left.

The Sakeji School, a primary boarding school in the Mwinilunga District overlooks the Sakeji River, which provides hydroelectric power and is used for recreation by the children.
A water wheel on the Sakeji powers a generator that charges battery cells at the school, providing power for lighting. Diesel generators are used to provide additional power as needed.

References

Sources

Rivers of Zambia